Danfysik is a Danish developer and manufacturer of particle accelerators for scientific research and medical usage, specialized magnets and particle accelerator power supplies.

History
The company was founded in 1964 by Ejnar Jespersen in Jyllinge. In 1974 it started selling synchrotron magnet systems.

In 2004 Siemens took over the medical particle therapy division of Danfysik. In 2009 Danfysik was bought by the Danish Technological Institute (DTI) and most of the company was moved to a building at DTI's campus. In 2011 the site in Jyllinge was closed.

Major projects
 Karlsruhe Institute of Technology ANKA synchrotron
 University Hospital of Giessen and Marburg light ion accelerator for particle therapy
 Jagiellonian University 1.5 GeV synchrotron
 CERN ISOLDE superconducting solenoids
 Aarhus University ASTRID2 synchrotron magnets and power supplies
 ITER European Dipole 18 kA power supply
 Shanghai Proton and Heavy Ion Center particle accelerator
 MAX IV magnet system

References

Technology companies of Denmark
Particle accelerators